Sirous Ghayeghran Stadium (Persian: ورزشگاه سیروس قایقران, Vârzeshgah-e Sirous Ghayeghran) is a football stadium in Bandar-e Anzali, Iran. It is the home stadium of Malavan.

Founded in 1953 as Diba Stadium, this stadium is one of the oldest stadiums in Iran and has been renamed twice. It was first named Takhti in 1981 in honor of the prominent Iranian wrestler (Gholamreza Takhti), and for the second time, at the request of the team's fans in 2022, the name of the stadium was changed to honor club legend Sirous Ghayeghran.

References 

Football venues in Iran
Buildings and structures in Gilan Province
Sport in Gilan Province
Malavan F.C.